Louis Alexandre d'Albignac (1739–1825) was a French général de division (major general). He was a chevalier of the Legion of Honour and a commander of the Order of Saint Louis.

References
 

1739 births
1825 deaths
Chevaliers of the Légion d'honneur
Commanders of the Order of Saint Louis